FinReg21.com is an online media company that provides news, commentary and expert content on financial services regulation in the U.S. and around the world.

A joint venture between Market Platform Dynamics and Sift Groups, FinReg21 was founded in March 2009, in the wake of the 2007-08 financial crisis. David S. Evans is the editor-in-chief.

Among the part of FinReg21's website are: 

 News (FinReg21 reporting plus content from Reuters, Business Wire, and PR Newswire)
 Commentary (content from around the web, including from LinkedIn Group, Proposals for the Reform of the Financial Services Industry, Simon Johnson, Scott Sumner, Paul Krugman, and Daniel Kauffman)
 Lombard Street (bi-weekly journal typically of five articles; topics include banking regulation and deposit insurance. Contributors include Richard Posner, Arnold Kling, Robert Litan and Viral Acharya)
 Channel 21 (roughly weekly webcasts moderated by Evans with Emilios Avgouleas and Geoffrey Manne, including: Obama’s "White Paper" on Regulation Reform with Robert Litan, Peter Wallison and Lawrence White; A Failure of Capitalism with Richard Posner; Getting Off Track with John B. Taylor; Is One the Right Number? with Wayne Abernathy.
 Podcasts: interviews that usually last about 30 minutes.  Some experts that have been interviewed are Bill Isaac, John Reed, and Laura Tyson.
 Profiles of important people in the financial services industry.
 Library Book reviews, testimonies, and thought leadership about the financial services industry.  Testimonies content is uploaded from the House Financial Services Committee and Books are updated with upcoming books.
 Who's Who: aims to bring together experts in the industry to interact and network with one another. There are Organization Profiles as well as Individual Profiles on Who's Who.

References 

Bank regulation
Financial regulation in the United States
Mass media companies based in Washington, D.C.